Make is a village in Kgalagadi District of Botswana. It is located in the Kalahari Desert and it has a primary school. The population was 398 in 2011 census.

References

Kgalagadi District
Villages in Botswana